Álex Cruz de Llano (born 1966) is a Spanish businessman, former chairman and chief executive officer (CEO) of British Airways and former CEO of Vueling.

Early life
Cruz was born and grew up in Bilbao, in the Spanish province of Biscay. He studied engineering at Central Michigan University in Mount Pleasant, Michigan from 1984 to 1988. He gained an MSc from Ohio State University in Columbus, Ohio, studying there from 1988 to 1990. In 1993, he attended an executive education program at Cox School of Business at Southern Methodist University in Dallas, Texas, while he was working for American Airlines.

Career
Cruz started his career with American Airlines, working for them in London for five years from 1990 to 1995. From 1995 to 2000, he worked for Sabre Corporation, a technological division of American Airlines.

Vueling
In summer 2006, Cruz became the founding CEO of Clickair, a low-cost airline. This became part of Vueling in July 2009; Spain's second-largest airline with 163 destinations.

British Airways
In November 2015, Cruz was hired by the CEO of International Airlines Group, Willie Walsh, as the next CEO and chairman of British Airways, to begin in April 2016. International Airlines Group, the owner of British Airways, also owns Vueling. Cruz succeeded Keith Williams.

In 2016 Cruz made 700 British Airways employees redundant when he closed down the airline's computer department. He then outsourced the company's computer systems to the Indian company Tata Consultancy Services, drawing negative comment from a trade unionist.
On 7th September 2018, British Airways announced that their online reservation systems had been accessed by an unauthorised third party. Between 21 August 2018 and 5 September 2018, the sensitive data of more than 420,000 British Airways customers was compromised. Initially, BA was fined £183 million by the Information Commissioner’s Office – a regulator – for the breach. However, in October 2020 a decision was granted to levy the fine, reducing it to £20 million.

On the environmental impact of aviation, he said in August 2019 that British Airways and its competitors had to start "thinking about flying in different ways".

In April 2020, during the global collapse in air travel brought along by the COVID-19 pandemic, he told British Airways' staff that he had set out plans to make up to 12,000 of them redundant. Unite the Union decried the move as "heartless", saying "to reject government support but then expect their own staff to pay the cost... is irresponsible, dangerous and destructive".

On 12 October 2020, it was announced that Sean Doyle, CEO of Aer Lingus (also part of International Airlines Group (IAG)) would succeed Cruz as CEO of British Airways. The move was carried out by IAG's new CEO Luis Gallego. There was a transition period in which he remained as non-executive chairman at British Airways in the run-up to Doyle also taking over that role in April 2021.

Personal life
He is married with four children, and lives in North London.

References

1966 births
American Airlines people
British Airways people
Central Michigan University alumni
Chief executives in the airline industry
Iberia (airline)
Ohio State University alumni
People from Bilbao
Spanish chief executives
Spanish company founders
Living people
Date of birth missing (living people)
20th-century Spanish businesspeople
21st-century Spanish businesspeople